Afzal Sharif is a Bangladeshi television and film actor. He acts mostly in comic roles. He won Bangladesh National Film Award for Best Actor in Comic Role in 2010 for his role in Nissash Amar Tumi.

Career
Sharif started his acting career as a stage actor in 1984. He performed regularly at stages until 1995. He debuted his television career through Bohubrihi drama serial in 1988. His first released film was Padma Nadir Majhi (1992).

Sharif has been suffering from spinal and bone issues since 2014.  In September 2018, Prime Minister Sheikh Hasina provided financial assistance of Tk. 20 lakh for his medical expenses.

Works

Theatre
 Jamidar Darpan
 Khotobi-kkhato
 Shat Ghater Kanakori
 Rakkhushi
 Mahapurush

Television
 Bohubrihi
 Ayomoy

Films
 Padma Nadir Majhi
 Dangafasad
 Priyo Podorekha
 Abdar
 Banglar Bou
 Natojanu
 Kistimaat 
 Musafir

References

Living people
Bangladeshi male television actors
Bangladeshi male film actors
Bangladeshi male stage actors
Best Performance in a Comic Role National Film Award (Bangladesh) winners
Year of birth missing (living people)
Place of birth missing (living people)